Kirby Myhill (born 5 February 1992) is a Welsh rugby union rugby player currently playing at Hooker for the Cardiff Rugby having progressed through the Scarlets academy. He is also a Wales and Wales Under-20 international.

Club career
Myhill made his Scarlets debut in 2011, coming on as a substitute in a 26–15 defeat to Leinster. His first start came later that year, in a 35–12 loss to Munster. So far in his career, Myhill has had to settle for a back-up role in the Scarlets squad, being behind the likes of Matthew Rees, Ken Owens and Emyr Phillips in the pecking order. Although he signed a contract extension with the Scarlets in April 2015, it was confirmed in April 2016 that Myhill, in the search for more first-team rugby, would move to the Cardiff Blues for the 2016–17 season. Early in the season, he suffered a knee injury that ruled him out for a couple of weeks. He signed a new contract with the Blues in June 2018, another in May 2019, and another in September 2020.

International career
Myhill represented Wales U20 and was named captain of the side for the 2012 Six Nations Under 20s Championship.

Following injuries to other hookers in the squad, Myhill was surprisingly called up by Wales for their test against New Zealand in October 2021. He made his debut off the bench on 30 October 2021.

Personal life
Myhill is the nephew of former Wales international rugby union flanker Mark Perego and brother of former Scarlets hooker Torin Myhill.

References

External links
Scarlets Profile (archived)
Cardiff Rugby Profile

1992 births
Living people
Rugby union players from Burry Port
Scarlets players
Welsh rugby union players
Cardiff Rugby players
Rugby union hookers
Wales international rugby union players